The Algerian Classico,  the matches between CR Belouizdad (CRB) and MC Oran (MCO) and gives rise to an important confrontation.  The first represents Algiers, the capital of the country, the second Oran, the second largest city in the country.  They are both among the most successful clubs in the country.

They are also the two clubs having played the greatest number of seasons in the Algerian Ligue Professionnelle 1, since they have both always been part of this elite, except for one season.  This confrontation is considered a rivalry in Algeria

History 
The rivalry between the two clubs began in the first season of the national Division 1 championship, organized after the country's independence in 1962. The first match between Mouloudia Club d'Oran and Chabab Riadhi Belouizdad (formerly Belcourt) took place during  of the third season, of which it marks the opening.

Sunday, September 13, 1964 thus saw the beginning of this Algerian football rivalry, in front of 25,000 spectators.  MCO top CRB with goals from Nehari (35th) and Karim Hmida (41st & 47th) to take them 3-0 up after an hour. CRB wakes up in the final half hour of play  to reduce the score on a collective work allowing Arab to shake twice the nets of Larbi "Elgool" (57th and 85th).

This first confrontation therefore ends with the victory of the MCO on the score of 3 goals to 2 against the CRB of the time.  The return match does not take place: the CRB wins the match by penalty following the suspension of MC Oran and MC Alger from all football activity by the Minister of Sport at the time.

All-time head-to-head results

All-Time Top Scorers

Hat-tricks
A hat-trick is achieved when the same player scores three or more goals in one match. Listed in chronological order.

Honours

League matches

Algerian Cup results

League Cup results

Shared player history

Players who have played for both clubs

Algerian Ligue Professionnelle 1 results

The tables list the place each team took in each of the seasons.

References

Football rivalries in Algeria
CR Belouizdad
MC Oran